Berns may refer to:

People
 Berns (surname)

Places
 Berns Salonger, a restaurant and entertainment venue in Stockholm, Sweden
 Bern's Steak House, a restaurant in Florida, USA